Bernard Busokoza (born August 6, 1953) is a Burundi Tutsi politician who served as the Vice President of Burundi from October 2013 to February 1, 2014.

Early life and education
Busokoza was born on August 6, 1953 in Mugamba Commune, Bururi Province, Burundi. In 1974, he graduated from the University of Burundi with a degree in economics.

Business career
Busokoza has held various senior positions across the country in the telecommunications field.

He was vice chairman of the Board of Directors of Meridien Biao Bank from 1988 until 1991. And From 1996–1999, he was CEO of Africell Burundi. He is currently the Vice-President of Africell's board.

Vice Presidency
In October 2013, Therence Sinunguruza resigned as vice president and Busokoza assumed the position.

Sacking
On February 1, 2014, after Busokoza opposed his plans to scrap presidential term limits, Pierre Nkurunziza, the President of Burundi, decided to dismiss Busokoza, sparking a major political crisis in Burundi. Some even compared the crisis to the South Sudanese Civil War. On 19 October 2020 the Supreme Court of Burundi sentenced Busokoza and 18 others to prison for involvement in the 1993 coup attempt and murder of President Melchior Ndadaye.

Personal life
Busokoza is a father of 6 children. He practices Catholicism.

References

Vice-presidents of Burundi
Living people
1953 births
University of Burundi alumni
Tutsi people